"Whatever" is a song by American female vocal group En Vogue. It was written by Kenneth "Babyface" Edmonds, Keith Andes, and Giuliano Franco for the group’s third studio album, EV3 (1997), while production was helmed by Edmonds, featuring additional production by Franco. Selected and released as the album's second single, it was the final single from EV3 to precede the release of its parent album. A moderate success, it reached the top ten in Canada and on Billboards Hot R&B/Hip-Hop Songs chart, while peaking within the top twenty in Finland, the United Kingdom and on the US Billboard Hot 100. "Whatever" was certified gold by the Recording Industry Association of America (RIAA) for shipments of over 500,000 units.

Background
"Whatever" was written by Kenneth "Babyface" Edmonds, Keith Andes, and Giuliano Franco, while production was overseen by Edmonds.  Franco served as a co-producer on the song. As with most on EV3, "Whatever" marked a breakaway for En Vogue who had worked exclusively with their founders Foster & McElroy throughout most of their career. As the album was nearing completion, Dawn Robinson chose to leave the group in April 1997 for a solo recording contract with Dr. Dre's Aftermath Records after difficult contractual negotiations reached a stalemate. Her abrupt departure from the band forced the remaining trio to re-record several of her original lead vocals; however, not every track was re-recorded, with Robinson's backing vocals remaining intact on "Whatever".

Critical reception
AllMusic editor Leo Stanley noted that on the track, Babyface is "funkier than [on] his previous work". Larry Flick from Billboard described it as a "slap-happy funk throw-down that elevates them miles above the glut of new-jill girl groups they've inspired." He remarked that "despite being reduced to a trio, the act doesn't miss a note vocally. Their harmonies remain distinctive and lush, thanks in large part to the savvy production of Babyface and Giuliano Franco. They dress the act in immediately insinuating beats, ear-grabbing keyboard loops, and guitar licks." J.D. Considine for Entertainment Weekly felt the lyrics to "Whatever" "depict a state of frustrated desire". A reviewer from Music Week rated it three out of five, viewing it as a "less instant, more downtempo funky groove". The magazine's Alan Jones complimented it as "a sweet jillswing groove that benefits from increasingly complex vocal interplay as it unfolds. It is unlikely to make the same kind of impression as Don't Let Go (Love), but will still be a big hit in the UK." 

Gerald Martinez from New Straits Times declared "Whatever" as a "midtempo and funky tune with a catchy chorus." John Mulvey from NME stated that it "retains a frankly terrifying power", noting "the sprung minimalism". Laura Jamison from Salon Magazine said that Babyface is "concocting a pop song jammed with hooks that don't require profound emotion -- perfect for En Vogue. These women can all sing, so when they get an opportunity to wail, they sound great." Ann Powers from Spin wrote that "stroking their tender buttons" in the song, En Vogue "bring it all back to the basics of gorgeous harmonies and mind-boggling vocal riffs." She also added Babyface transforming the background vocals of the track "into android-precise sonic effects that bring out the eeriness in En Vogue's flawless form." Ian Hyland from Sunday Mirror stated that the hit singles "Whatever" and "Don't Let Go (Love)" may well be brilliant but they only add more spice to a mighty fine collection."

Music video
The horror movie-inspired music video for "Whatever", directed by Matthew Rolston, features the girls and the doctors disguised as zombies in a modern beauty salon with "Thriller-esque hair and makeup". They are surrounded by doctors and nurses dressed in orange outfits performing various surgical procedures. Cindy Herron is shown pulling a face statue in a lightning filled hallway, while she begins the song covering up her face with a mask then removing to sing the first verse, replacing it back after the final chorus. Maxine Jones is seen singing in front of a three-way mirror in a blue dress. Terry Ellis sings in pale zombie-like makeup while wearing a beauty micrometer as a doctor attends to her. Several beauty enhancement procedures are shown in the video – face lifts, breast augmentation, even skin whitening. According to Vibe, the video was "not warmly received."

Track listings

 US CD single
 "Whatever" (Album Version) – 4:22
 "Whatever" (The Tumblin' Dice Remix - Extended Club Remix)  – 5:43
 "Whatever" (The Tumblin' Dice Remix - Radio Remix W/O Rap) – 4:22
 "Its About Love" – 5:10
 "Whatever" (Album Instrumental) – 4:22
 "Whatever" (The Tumblin' Dice Remix Instrumental) – 4:16

 UK CD single
 "Whatever" (Radio Edit) – 4:11
 "Whatever" (Mousse T. Radio Mix) – 4:00
 "Whatever" (Lemon D. Remix) – 8:40
 "Whatever" (The Tumblin' Dice Radio Remix) – 4:16

 US 12-inch vinyl
 "Whatever" (Album Version) – 4:22
 "Whatever" (Radio Edit) – 4:11
 "Whatever" (Instrumental) – 4:22
 "Whatever" (T.V. Track) - 4:22

 US 12-inch vinyl, Dance Remixes
 "Whatever" (Mucho Soul Mix) – 6:27
 "Whatever" (Shelter Dub) – 6:35
 "Whatever" (Tuff Jam's Unda-Vybe Dub) – 6:55
 "Whatever" (Tuff Jam's 2 in 1 Instrumental) – 8:05

 UK 12-inch vinyl
 "Whatever" (Lemon D. Remix) – 8:40
 "Whatever" (Roni's Searching For The New Key Mix) – 6:59

 UK Remix CD single
 "Whatever" (Towa Tei Remix) – 5:09
 "Whatever" (Towa Tei Remix - Instrumental) – 5:29

 US Remix CD single
 "Whatever" (The Tumblin' Dice Remix - Extended Club Remix  – 5:43
 "Whatever" (The Tumblin' Dice Remix Radio Remix without Rap) – 4:16
 "Whatever" (The Tumblin' Dice Remix Instrumental) – 4:16
 "Whatever" (The Tumblin' Dice Remix A Capella) – 4:16

 Japan CD single
 "Whatever" (Album Version) – 4:22
 "Whatever" (The Tumblin' Dice Remix) – 4:16
 "Don't Let Go (Love)" (Album Version) – 4:52
 "Don't Let Go (Love)" (2000 Watts Remix)  – 4:09

Credits

 Co-producer – Giuliano Franco
 Producer – Babyface
 Guitar – Mark Coleman
 Programmed by Randy Walker

 Engineered and mixed by Manny Marroquin
 Produced for ECAF Productions, Inc.
 Recorded at Brandon's Way Recording
 Mixed at Brandon's Way Recording

Charts

Weekly charts

Year-end charts

Certifications

Release history

References

En Vogue songs
1997 singles
1997 songs
East West Records singles
Song recordings produced by Babyface (musician)
Songs written by Babyface (musician)